Phu Tho Horse Racing Ground was the only place in Ho Chi Minh City and in Vietnam that organized horse racing. The racing ground was founded by the French colonists during French Indochina. It is situated in District 11, Ho Chi Minh City.

It was the scene of a major battle between the Viet Cong and the Army of the Republic of Vietnam and the United States Army during the Tet Offensive.

Phu Tho racecourse was built by the French in 1932 with an area of 444,540 m2. From May 31, 2011, the racecourse was closed by decision of the People's Committee of Ho Chi Minh City.

References

External links
US Army helicopters at the racetrack during the Tet Offensive

Sports venues in Ho Chi Minh City
Horse racing venues in Vietnam